Lund is a small unincorporated community in northeast Travis County, Texas, United States.

References

External links
 

Unincorporated communities in Texas
Unincorporated communities in Travis County, Texas